Ibrahim AlHusseini is a venture capitalist, entrepreneur, and environmentalist. He is the founder and CEO of FullCycle, an investment company accelerating the deployment of climate-restoring technologies. AlHusseini is also the founder and managing partner of The Husseini Group.

He served as the co-executive producer of the 2013 Academy Award-nominated documentary, The Square. In 2015, AlHusseini won a Global Green Millennium Award for his efforts in combating global climate change.

Early life and education
AlHusseini was born in Jordan and was raised in Saudi Arabia by parents who are Palestinian refugees. He immigrated to the United States in the 1990s to attend college at the University of Washington, and currently resides in Los Angeles.

Career

Financial career
AlHusseini has started and sold numerous companies throughout his entrepreneurial career. These include MECA Communications, which introduced the world's first interoperable instant messaging application Natural Solutions, and PakIT, the last of which is a packaging company that developed food-grade packaging material from biodegradable cellulose.

He was also an early investor in Tesla Motors, Bloom Energy, Aspiration, Uber, CleanChoice Energy and numerous other companies with an environmentally-friendly focus.

In 2013, AlHusseini founded the FullCycle, an investment firm that focuses on climate-critical technologies and infrastructure projects. The investments are in technologies that target short-lived climate pollutants. The company has made investments in engineering and technology firm, Synova, controlled environment agriculture company, Sustainitech, textile innovations company, Evrnu and micro-hydro startup, InPipe Energy.

AlHusseini has been a vocal critic of the Trump administration's immigration policies.

Entertainment career
In 2013, AlHusseini co-executive produced the documentary, The Square, about the Egyptian Revolution of 2011 that began at Tahrir Square. The film was nominated for the Academy Award for Best Documentary Feature at the 86th Academy Awards. The film was also nominated for 4 Emmy Awards and won 3 at the 66th Primetime Creative Arts Emmy Awards. He is also the executive producer on the films, Space Oddity and Canary.

Recognition and awards
In 2015, AlHusseini was honored with a Millennium Award from the Global Green organization. In September 2020, he was recognized in the Impact 50 list of the most notable impact investors presented by Forbes.

References

External links
 Ibrahim AlHusseini Official Website

American film producers
American venture capitalists
University of Washington alumni
Living people
Year of birth missing (living people)